Nuevo is the Spanish word for "new". It may refer to:

 Nuevo, California, a town in the state of California
 Nuevo (band), featuring singer and musician Peter Godwin
 Nuevo (Bayamón), a settlement in Puerto Rico
 "Nuevo", Spanish-language version of "Novo" (song) by Laura Pausini (2018}
 Nuevo (album), a 2002 album by the Kronos Quartet